Eng Lake is a lake in Douglas County, in the U.S. state of Minnesota.

Eng Lake was named for Erick Pehrson Eng, a pioneer settler.

The elevation level of the lake is 411 meters / 1348 feet.

See also
List of lakes in Minnesota

References

Lakes of Minnesota
Lakes of Douglas County, Minnesota